Worthen is a surname. Notable people with the surname include:

Amos Henry Worthen, American geologist
Amy Namowitz Worthen (born 1946), American artist
Augusta Harvey Worthen (1823–1910), American author and teacher
Clyde Worthen, American judoka
Ezekiel Worthen (1710–1793), American military officer
Joey Worthen (born 1979), American soccer player
John Worthen (literary critic), English academic, literary critic and biographer
John E. Worthen (born 1933), American university president
Kevin J Worthen (born 1957), American lawyer and BYU president
Molly Worthen (born 1981), American writer
Naz Worthen (born 1966), American football player
Rande Worthen (born 1956), American politician
Sam Worthen (born 1958), American basketball player
Sandra Worthen (1937-2022), American politician
Shawn Worthen (born 1978), American football player
Trebor Worthen (born 1980), American politician
William Ezra Worthen (1819–1897), American civil engineer